Ward W. Briggs Jr. (born November 26, 1945, in Riverside, California) is an American classicist and historian of classical studies. He taught until 2011 as Carolina Distinguished Professor of Classics and Louise Fry Scudder Professor of Humanities at the University of South Carolina.

Education and career 
Briggs studied at the University of North Carolina at Chapel Hill, where he wrote his MA thesis on Horace and his PhD thesis, under the supervision of Brooks Otis, on Virgil.

His research interests include Roman poetry and the history of classical studies in North America. He is the editor, co-editor, and author of several standard works in his field. He published, among other items, a biography of Basil Lanneau Gildersleeve, the founder of modern American study of classical antiquity.

Selected works 
 Aspects of Horace, Odes 3.19. Chapel Hill 1969
 Repetitions from Virgil’s Georgics in the Aeneid. Chapel Hill 1974
 Narrative and Simile from the Georgics in the Aeneid. Leiden 1980 (Mnemosyne Supplements 58)
As editor
 Concordantia in Varronis Libros de re rustica. Hildesheim 1983
 with Herbert W. Benario: Basil Lanneau Gildersleeve: An American Classicist. Baltimore 1986
 with Herbert W. Benario: The Letters of Basil Lanneau Gildersleeve. Baltimore 1987. 
 with William M. Calder III: Classical Scholarship: A Biographical Encyclopedia. New York/London 1990. 
 The Selected Classical Papers of Basil Lanneau Gildersleeve. Atlanta 1992
 Biographical Dictionary of North American Classicists. Westport (Connecticut)/London 1994. 
 with E. Christian Kopff: The Roosevelt lectures of Paul Shorey (1913–1914). Hildesheim/Zürich/New York 1995. 
 Soldier and scholar: Basil Lanneau Gildersleeve and the Civil War. Charlottesville 1998

References

External links 
 
 Ward W. Briggs at the University of South Carolina

American classical scholars
21st-century American historians
21st-century American male writers
Institute for Advanced Study visiting scholars
Classical scholars of the University of South Carolina
University of North Carolina at Chapel Hill alumni
1945 births
Living people
Scholars of Latin literature
Writers from Riverside, California
Historians from California
American male non-fiction writers